Tel Afek,, also spelled Aphek and Afeq, is an archaeological site located in the coastal hinterland of the Ein Afek Nature Reserve, east of Kiryat Bialik, Israel. It is also known as Tel Kurdani.

History

Chalcolithic
The site has remains dating back to the Chalcolithic age.

Bronze Age
Tombs from the Middle Bronze Age and  Late Bronze Ages have been excavated here. 

A number of burial caves cut into chalk-like bedrock are dated to Middle Bronze Age IIA and are believed to have been reused during Late Bronze Age II. The pottery assemblage consists of vessel types from the Early, Middle and Late Bronze periods, with the later pottery finds presenting both local types and imports, such as Cypriot ‘milk bowls’ and bilbils as well as a few Mycenaean vessels.

Classical Age
According to  Biblical history, this area was part of Cabul and was given to Hiram I by Solomon as a reward for various services rendered to him in building the First Temple. .

Pottery from the   Persian,  Hellenistic  Roman,  and the  Byzantine   eras have been found here.

Crusader/Mamluk era
Pottery from the   Crusader times  have been found here.
In  the Crusader era,  it was known as Recordane, and in  1154, the mill and village was acquired  the Hospitalliers.  The Hospitalliers owned the water mills here for a number of years.  Between 1235 and 1262 the Hospitalliers had a dispute with the Templars about water rights. 

Two aqueducts, dating from this era, have been excavated.

In 1283 it was still  part of the Crusader states, as it was mentioned as part of their domain in the hudna between the Crusaders based in Acre and the Mamluk sultan  Qalawun.

According to al-Maqrizi, it had come under Mamluk rule in 1291, when it was mentioned under the name of  Kerdanah  when  sultan al-Ashraf Khalil allocated the village's income to a waqf in Cairo.

A two-story fortress still stands. A water-powered flour mill operated on the lower floor.

Ottoman era
The village was noted as "hali" (empty), but taxes were paid, a total of 1,800 akçe. All of the revenues went to a waqf. The stair to the tower roof of the mill, and two more wheel-chambers in the southern part of the mill was added in the Ottoman period.

In 1856 it was named Kurdany on Kiepert's map of Palestine published that year.

In 1875 Victor Guérin visited, and noted about Tell el-Kerdaneh: "To the north and bottom of this tell, along the marsh, we observe the remains of an enclosure which measured 54 steps long by 40 wide, and which seems to have been that of a fortified khan. All the walls have been removed; the inner blockage alone partly remained." About the surrounding march, and mill, he noted that it was the origin of the Nahr Na'min, and "These springs, at their origin, are immediately abundant enough to form a considerable river and to turn the millstones of a millstone. Near this mill, we note the lower foundations of an old bridge and the remains of a tower pierced with loopholes and ogival vaults. It had two floors, and was built with ashlars on which many crosses were traced, and some at a height that the hand cannot reach. Therefore, these crosses could not be engraved there by passing travelers, who would have needed a ladder to place them so high, but they must go back to the time when this tower was occupied by Christians, and most likely date from the time of the Crusades. Above the front door was a mâchecoulis balcony, the trace of which is very visible."

In  1881, the PEF's Survey of Western Palestine (SWP)  found at Kh. Khurdaneh (east of the mill)  only heaps of stones. The name, Kh. Kurdâneh was taken to mean the ruin of Kurdâneh, p.n. 

In 1900, Gottlieb Schumacher found here markings on the mill which he took to be Phoenician.

British Mandate era
The area was acquired by the Jewish community under the Sursock Purchase. In 1925 a Zionist organisation purchased  1,500 dunums in Kordaneh, from Alfred Sursuk, of  the Sursuk family of Beirut.  At the time, there were 20 families living there.

In the 1931 census of Palestine,  Mathanat Kurdani was counted under  Shefa-'Amr.

See also
 Archaeology of Israel

References

Bibliography

 
 
 
 

  

Ornan, Tallay, 2007, "Labor Pangs: The Revadim Plaque Type", in Bickel, S., Schroer, S. and Uehlinger, Ch. (eds.), Bilder als Quellen / Images as Sources. Studies on Ancient Near Eastern Artefacts and the Bible inspired by the work of Othmar Keel, OBO Special Volume, Fribourg and Göttingen, 2007, pp. 215–235, pl.XXIV.  
 

 

 

 
 (p.  486)

External links 
Survey of Western Palestine, Map 5:    IAA, Wikimedia commons

Archaeological sites in Israel
Bronze Age palaces in Israel
Former populated places in Southwest Asia
Tel Afek
Castles and fortifications of the Knights Hospitaller
Castles and fortifications of the Knights Templar
Protected areas of Haifa District